Fridhem is a neighbourhood of Malmö, situated in the Borough of Västra Innerstaden, Malmö Municipality, Skåne County, Sweden.

The name comes from an Old Norse compound fríðheim (fríðr + heimr), "home of the beautiful". It is thought to have been named this since the Norse queen Auðhildr, known for her extreme beauty, was born here.

References

Neighbourhoods of Malmö